Welcome Thornburg Gaston (December 19, 1874 in Senecaville, Ohio – December 13, 1944 in Columbus, Ohio) was an American pitcher in Major League Baseball. He played for the Brooklyn Bridegrooms/Superbas during parts of the 1898 and 1899 seasons.

External links

1874 births
1944 deaths
19th-century baseball players
Major League Baseball pitchers
Brooklyn Bridegrooms players
Brooklyn Superbas players
Toronto Canucks players
Taunton Herrings players
Hamilton Hams players
Detroit Tigers (Western League) players
Cleveland Lake Shores players
Dayton Veterans players
Colorado Springs Millionaires players
Denver Grizzlies (baseball) players
Baseball players from Ohio
People from Guernsey County, Ohio